The Hungarian National Front (MNA) was a far-right Hungarist and neo-Nazi paramilitary movement, founded in 1989 by István Győrkös as Hungarian National Socialist Action Group (also abbreviated MNA). The organization adopted its current name on 29 November 1992, after a court ruled to ban National Socialist name and symbols.

References

1989 establishments in Hungary
2016 disestablishments in Hungary
Neo-Nazism in Hungary